Baltona (full: Baltona Foreign Trade Company Spółka Akcyjna, former Baltona - zaopatrywanie statków) is a Polish company acting mainly on a duty-free market in Poland and abroad.

History 
Baltona was established on 3 September 1946, as a private company. Its principal activity was supplying ships in Polish and foreign ports. 

On 29 December 1949, Baltona was nationalized for the symbolic price of 1 Polish złoty. On 1 January 1951, the enterprise subordinated to the Polish Ministry of Foreign Trade. Its business consisted of supplying Polish ships, planes, diplomatic posts, airports, seaports, border crossings, and even scientific expeditions.

In 1957, Baltona joined the International Ship Suppliers Association (ISSA) and began exchanging information among ship chandlers.

In 1960, Baltona extended its operations to airport facilities by an agreement with LOT Polish Airlines to supply company's planes with goods intended for retail sale and consumption by crews and passengers.

The company grew and became a large export-import company during the 1970s and 1980s. During the time of the People's Republic of Poland, it was one of the few companies offering Western goods to Polish consumers for foreign currency. At the height of its popularity during the mid-1980s, Baltona operated nearly 250 stores and had over 2,000 employees. In 1984 it was transformed into a joint stock company ( or S.A.).

In 2013, Baltona took over Chacalli de Decke, a Belgium-based duty-free company. It has since further developed operations in the food and beverages sector.

References

History of the company

External links
Baltona, home page

Hard currency shops in socialist countries
Retail companies established in 1946
1946 establishments in Poland
Government-owned companies of Poland
Companies listed on the Warsaw Stock Exchange
Retail companies of Poland